Ioannis Georgallis (alternate spellings: Giannis, Georgalis) (born May 17, 1983) is a Greek former professional basketball player, who finished his club playing career as the team captain of Kolossos Rodou of the Greek Basket League and a current basketball coach. At a height of 2.00 m (6 ft 6  in) tall, and a weight 104 kg (230 lbs), he mainly played at the small forward position.

Professional career
Georgallis began his professional career in 2000, with the Greek club Apollon Patras. In 2006, he moved to the Greek club Panellinios, and the next year, he joined the Greek club Panionios. In 2009, he returned to Panellinios. In October 2010, he signed a three-year contract with the Greek club Kolossos Rodou. He returned to Apollon Patras in 2014. He went back to Kolossos Rodou in 2015, where he eventually became the team captain, and he played with the team for four more seasons. Georgallis announced his retirement from the sport, on August 17, 2019.

National team career
Georgallis won the silver medal at the 1999 FIBA Europe Under-16 Championship, and the gold medal at the 2002 FIBA Europe Under-20 Championship, as a member of the Greek junior national basketball teams. He also won the silver medal at the 2005 Mediterranean Games, while playing with Greece's under-26 national selection.

Awards and accomplishments
1999 FIBA Europe Under-16 Championship: 
2002 FIBA Europe Under-20 Championship: 
2005 Mediterranean Games:

References

External links
Euroleague.net Profile
FIBA Europe Profile
Eurobasket.com Profile
Hellenic Federation Profile 

1983 births
Living people
Apollon Patras B.C. players
Australian people of Greek descent
Competitors at the 2005 Mediterranean Games
Greek men's basketball players
Kolossos Rodou B.C. players
Mediterranean Games medalists in basketball
Mediterranean Games silver medalists for Greece
Panellinios B.C. players
Panionios B.C. players
Shooting guards
Small forwards
Basketball players from Sydney
People from Rhodes